Lillian de la Torre Bueno McCue (née Bueno; pen name, Lillian de la Torre; March 15, 1902 – September 13, 1993) was an American novelist and a prolific writer of historical mysteries. She served as President of the Mystery Writers of America.

Biography
Born in Manhattan in 1902, de la Torre received master's degrees from Columbia University and Harvard. Her first novel was Elizabeth Is Missing, or Truth Triumphant, published by Knopf in 1945.  

Her most popular works were the Dr. Sam: Johnson, Detector series of 33 detective stories that cast 18th century literary figures Samuel Johnson and James Boswell into Sherlock Holmes and Dr. Watson roles. This series, which de la Torre began in 1943 with The Great Seal of England, is one of the earliest examples of the historical mystery, a literary genre which combines historical fiction and the whodunit/detective story. 

She also wrote numerous books, short stories for Ellery Queen's Mystery Magazine, reviews for The New York Times Book Review, poetry and plays. Her play Goodbye, Miss Lizzie Borden was adapted as the episode "The Older Sister" for Alfred Hitchcock Presents. She was a President of the Mystery Writers of America, and was nominated for an Edgar Award for Best Fact Crime for The Truth about Belle Gunness (1955).

She died in 1993 at the age of 91. She was predeceased by her husband George McCue.

Selected works

Novels
'Elizabeth is Missing', Or, Truth Triumphant: An Eighteenth Century Mystery (1945)
The Heir of Douglas (1953)
The Truth about Belle Gunness (1955)
The Actress (1957)

Short story collections
Dr. Sam: Johnson, Detector (1948)
The Detections of Dr. Sam: Johnson (1960)
The Return of Dr. Sam: Johnson, Detector (1985)
The Exploits of Dr. Sam: Johnson, Detector (1987)

Plays
Goodbye, Miss Lizzie Borden

References

External links
Lillian de la Torre papers, MSS 2167, at the L. Tom Perry Special Collections Library, Harold B. Lee Library, Brigham Young University

1902 births
1993 deaths
Writers from Manhattan
20th-century American novelists
American historical novelists
American mystery novelists
Writers of historical mysteries
American women novelists
20th-century American women writers
Radcliffe College alumni
Women mystery writers
Women historical novelists
Columbia University alumni
Novelists from New York (state)